Tun Azizan bin Zainul Abidin (28 May 1935 – 14 July 2004) was a Malaysian corporate figure and president of the Putrajaya Corporation and of Petronas.

Life
Azizan was born on 28 May 1935, in Air Itam, Penang. He had 3 children with his wife Noor Ainne Che Teh: Amir Hamzah Azizan, Norizan Azizan and Ikhwan Azizan and 7 grand children

Career
In 1960, he joined the Ministry of Education, becoming senior private secretary to the Second Prime Minister of Malaysia, Tun Abdul Razak Hussein (1971-1974).  In 1988, he retired as chief secretary of the Ministry of Home Affairs.

Post-government career
Azizan joined Petronas as Petronas President and chief executive officer, holding the position from February 1988 to February 1995. In addition, he was a chairman of Malaysia Airlines, Putrajaya Corporation, KLCC Holdings (M) Sdn Bhd, Petronas Carigali Sdn Bhd, MTBE Malaysia Sdn Bhd, Petronas Trading Limited, Malaysia LNG Sdn Bhd and Suria KLCC Sdn Bhd.

He is remembered for his work in developing Putrajaya, the Federal Government Administrative Centre.

He was appointed Pro-Chancellor of Universiti Teknologi Malaysia (UTM) and a member of the World Economic Forum; Kuala Lumpur hosted the forum in 2002. He was Chairman of the ASEAN-Canada Business Council, Treasurer of the Crime Prevention Foundation and a Member of the Management Improvement Commission of the Royal Malaysian Police.

Death
Azizan died on 14 July 2004 at the age of 68, and was buried at the Muslim Cemetery in Taman Selatan, Putrajaya.

Honours
On 5 June 2010, five years after his death, he was posthumously awarded the Malaysian federal highest award, the Seri Setia Mahkota Malaysia (SSM), which carries the title "Tun" in conjunction with the birthday of the 13th Yang di-Pertuan Agong, Tuanku Mizan Zainal Abidin, at Istana Negara, Kuala Lumpur.

He also received the Order of the Commander of the Legion of Honour from the French government in October 2003, the Norwegian government award for "outstanding contribution to quality " in management in 1992 and the Vietnam Friendship Medal by the government in September 2001.

Honours of Malaysia
  :
 Companion of the Order of the Defender of the Realm (J.M.N) (1978)
 Commander of the Order of Loyalty to the Crown of Malaysia (P.S.M.) – Tan Sri (1987)
 Grand Commander of the Order of Loyalty to the Crown of Malaysia (S.S.M.) – Tun (2010 – posthumously)
 :
 Knight Commander of the Most Exalted Order of the Star of Sarawak (P.N.B.S.) – Dato Sri (1991)
 :
 Commander of the Order of the Defender of State (D.G.P.N.) – Dato' Seri (2001)

Legacy
A cargo ship converted by Petronas for use in the Eastern Sabah Security Zone is named after him.

References

External links
A GEM AMONG THE GEMS: TUN AZIZAN ZAINUL ABIDIN - Young Leadership Voices
Tun Azizan Zainul Abidin - Permata Yang Hilang

1935 births
2005 deaths
Knights Commander of the Most Exalted Order of the Star of Sarawak
Malaysian people of Malay descent
Malaysian Muslims
People from Penang
20th-century Malaysian businesspeople
Grand Commanders of the Order of Loyalty to the Crown of Malaysia
Commanders of the Order of Loyalty to the Crown of Malaysia
Companions of the Order of the Defender of the Realm